Werauhia uxoris is a plant species in the genus Werauhia. This species is endemic to Costa Rica.

References

uxoris
Endemic flora of Costa Rica